Observeur du Design is an award created by APCI to promote design as a key factor in business competitiveness as well as economic, social and cultural innovation.

The APCI develops permanent promotional and design actions and makes good use of its expertise and that of its networks, in the world, in fulfilling specific actions on its partners’ request or of its own initiative.

References

Design awards